Tabda, also known as Tabto, is a town in the southern Lower Juba (Jubbada Hoose) region of Somalia.

References
Tabda

Populated places in Lower Juba